
Gmina Pełczyce is an urban-rural gmina (administrative district) in Choszczno County, West Pomeranian Voivodeship, in north-western Poland.

The gmina contains part of the protected area called Barlinek-Gorzów Landscape Park.

Villages
Apart from the town of Pełczyce, Gmina Pełczyce contains the villages and settlements of Będargowiec, Będargowo, Boguszyny, Bolewice, Brzyczno, Bukwica, Chrapowo, Dolne, Dubielewo, Golejewo, Jagów, Jarosławsko, Kępiniec, Krzynki, Lubiana, Lubianka, Ługowo, Łyskowo, Nadarzyn, Niesporowice, Płotno, Przekolno, Przyłęki, Puszczyn, Sarnik, Sułkowo, Trynno, Trzęsacz and Wierzchno.

Neighbouring gminas
Gmina Pełczyce is bordered by the gminas of Barlinek, Choszczno, Dolice, Krzęcin and Strzelce Krajeńskie.

References
Polish official population figures 2006

Pelczyce
Choszczno County